Navy Camp ( – Ardūgāh-e Nīrvī Darīāyī) is a village and military installation in Baladeh Kojur Rural District, in the Central District of Nowshahr County, Mazandaran Province, Iran. At the 2006 census, its population was 268, in 75 families.

References 

Populated places in Nowshahr County
Populated coastal places in Iran
Populated places on the Caspian Sea